Silvia de Tapia (born 5 January 1940) is a Mexican archer who represented Mexico at the 1972 Summer Olympic Games in archery.

Olympics 

She finished 23rd in the women's individual event with a score of 2258 points.

References

External links 
 Profile on worldarchery.org

1940 births
Living people
Mexican female archers
Olympic archers of Mexico
Archers at the 1972 Summer Olympics
20th-century Mexican women